The School-Centred Initial Teacher Training (SCITT) programme is a teacher-training course in England.

The SCITT enables graduates to undertake their training within a school environment, leading to Qualified Teacher Status. Some SCITT programmes also award a Postgraduate Certificate in Education (PGCE) qualification.

The programmes cover primary, middle and secondary age ranges and candidates work in a consortium of schools within a designated region.

The entrance requirements and funding availability is the same as for PGCE courses and applications are also made through the UCAS, where applications can be monitored using UCAS 'Track'.

References

Teacher training